The eighth season of Chicago P.D., an American police drama television series with executive producer Dick Wolf, and producers Derek Haas, Michael Brandt, and Rick Eid. The season premiered on November 11, 2020.

Cast

Regular cast members 

 Jason Beghe as Sergeant Henry "Hank" Voight
 Jesse Lee Soffer as Detective Jay Halstead
 Tracy Spiridakos as Detective Hailey Upton
 Marina Squerciati as Officer Kim Burgess
 Patrick John Flueger as Officer Adam Ruzek
 LaRoyce Hawkins as Officer Kevin Atwater
 Amy Morton as Desk Sergeant Trudy Platt

Recurring characters 
 Nicole Ari Parker as Deputy Superintendent Samantha Miller
 Cleveland Berto as Officer Andre Cooper
 Elena Marisa Flores as Officer Rosado
 Jack Coleman as Disco Bob Ruzek
 Ramona Edith Williams as Makayla Ward

Guest starring 
 Jocelyn Zamudio as Elena Sanchez

Episodes

Production
Filming for season 8 began October 6, 2020. On September 22, 2020, Nicole Ari Parker joined the cast as Deputy Superintendent Samantha Miller. In December 2020, Cleveland Berto was announced to be joining the cast as a series regular in the role of Jalen Walker. The character was later renamed Andre Cooper and Berto was only credited in three episodes as a guest star.

Ratings

References

https://www.chicagotribune.com/suburbs/lake-county-news-sun/ct-lns-ent-chicago-pd-waukegan-st-0327-20210325-owjf5xbx45dmfhka3wrr4ej75q-story.html

External links

2020 American television seasons
2021 American television seasons
Chicago P.D. (TV series) seasons
Television productions postponed due to the COVID-19 pandemic
Television shows about the COVID-19 pandemic